is a Japanese singer who was a member of the idol group X21. She has also appeared in television programmes and magazines. She is represented with the agency Oscar Promotion.

Biography
She received a model award at the "13th All Japan National Bishoujo Contest" held in August 2012. She joined the band X21 that was formed mainly from the top winners of that contest and debuted in the entertainment world.

In June 2015, she was selected as a member of the idol unit Magical Dreamin' formed to sing the TV Tokyo anime Jewelpet: Magical Change opening theme.

Works

CD

Singles
As Magical Dreamin

Image videos

Filmography

Television

Radio

Magazines

Image character

See also
X21 (band)

References

External links
 – official blog 

Japanese gravure idols
Japanese television personalities
Models from Hyōgo Prefecture
1999 births
Living people